Llico River is one of the principal rivers of Llanquihue Province in southern Chile. It runs from northeast to southwest draining part of the eastern slopes of Cordillera del Sarao, which is part of Chilean Coast Range. The local equivalent of the Mindel and Elsterian glaciations is named Río Llico glaciation.

See also
List of rivers of Chile

Rivers of Chile
Rivers of Los Lagos Region